Facundo Gabriel Zabala (born 2 January 1999) is an Argentine professional footballer who plays as a left back for Primera División club Olimpia, on loan from Venezia.

Career
In 2017, Zabala almost signed for Italian Serie A side Catania Calcio but the transfer never happened.

For the second half of 2018–19, he signed for Alajuelense in the Costa Rican top flight from the youth academy of Argentine top flight club Rosario Central.

APOEL
For the second half of the season he joined APOEL making his debut in a 3–1 win against Nea Salamina. He scored his first goal for Apoel in a 1–0 win against rivals AC Omonia sending APOEL to the semi finals of the cup.

Venezia
On 1 July 2022, Zabala signed a contract with Italian club Venezia for three seasons, with an option for a fourth. On 10 January 2023, he was loaned to Olimpia in Paraguay until 31 December 2023, with an option to buy.

References

External links
 

1999 births
Footballers from Rosario, Santa Fe
Living people
Argentine footballers
Association football defenders
L.D. Alajuelense footballers
APOEL FC players
Venezia F.C. players
Club Olimpia footballers
Liga FPD players
Cypriot First Division players
Serie B players
Argentine expatriate footballers
Expatriate footballers in Costa Rica
Argentine expatriate sportspeople in Costa Rica
Expatriate footballers in Cyprus
Argentine expatriate sportspeople in Cyprus
Expatriate footballers in Italy
Argentine expatriate sportspeople in Italy
Expatriate footballers in Paraguay
Argentine expatriate sportspeople in Paraguay